Scopula liotis is a moth of the  family Geometridae. It is found in Australia (New South Wales).

References

Moths described in 1888
liotis
Moths of Australia